Mowbray Park is a small village in the Macarthur Region of New South Wales, Australia, in the Wollondilly Shire.

References

Localities in New South Wales
Wollondilly Shire